Rolziracetam is a nootropic drug of the racetam family.

Rolziracetam was found to improve performance on a delayed-response task in aged rhesus monkeys. It has a wide margin of safety in animals and has been evaluated for use in cognitively impaired human subjects.

See also
 Piracetam

References 

Racetams
Pyrrolizines